Rudolph Maté (born Rudolf Mayer; 21 January 1898 – 27 October 1964) was a Polish-Hungarian-American cinematographer, film director and film producer who worked as cameraman and cinematographer in Hungary, Austria, Germany, France and the United Kingdom, before moving to Hollywood in the mid 1930s.

Life and career
Born in Kraków (then in the Grand Duchy of Kraków, Austro-Hungarian Empire,  now in Poland) into a Jewish family, Maté began in the film business after his graduation from the University of Budapest. He worked as an assistant cameraman in Hungary and later throughout Europe, sometimes with colleague Karl Freund. Maté worked on several of Carl Th. Dreyer's films, including The Passion of Joan of Arc (1928) and Vampyr (1932).

He worked as cinematographer on Hollywood films from the mid-1930s, including Dodsworth (1936), the Laurel and Hardy feature Our Relations (1936) and Stella Dallas (1937). He was nominated for the Academy Award for Best Cinematography in five consecutive years, for Alfred Hitchcock's Foreign Correspondent (1940), Alexander Korda's That Hamilton Woman (1941), Sam Wood's The Pride of the Yankees (1942), Zoltan Korda's Sahara (1943),  and Charles Vidor's Cover Girl (1944).

In 1947, he turned to directing films; his credits include the film noir D.O.A. (1949), No Sad Songs for Me (1950), When Worlds Collide (1951), and the epic The 300 Spartans (1962).

Some sixteen months after completing his last film, a low budget, limited-release comedy shot in Greece and scored by Manos Hatzidakis, Maté suffered a heart attack while in Hollywood  and died on 27 October 1964, at the age of 66.

Filmography

As director 

 It Had to Be You (1947)
 The Dark Past (1948)
 D.O.A. (1949)
 No Sad Songs for Me (1950)
 Union Station (1950)
 Branded (1950)
 The Prince Who Was a Thief (1951)
 When Worlds Collide (1951)
 The Green Glove (1952)
 Sally and Saint Anne (1952)
 Paula (1952)
 The Mississippi Gambler (1953)
 Second Chance (1953)
 Forbidden (1953)
 The Black Shield of Falworth (1954)
 Siege at Red River (1954)
 The Violent Men (1955)
 The Far Horizons (1955)
 Miracle in the Rain (1956)
 The Rawhide Years (1956)
 Port Afrique (1956)
 Three Violent People (1957)
 The Deep Six (1958)
 For the First Time (1959)
 Revak the Rebel (1960)
 The 300 Spartans (1962)
 Seven Seas to Calais (1962)
 Aliki (1963)

As producer 
 The Return of October (1948)
 The 300 Spartans (1962)
 Aliki my love (1963)

As cinematographer 

 Kutató Sámuel (1919)
 Alpentragödie (1920)
 Das Gänsemädchen (1920)
 Lucifer  (1921)
 Der geistliche Tod (1921)
 Parema - Das Wesen aus der Sternenwelt (1922)
 Eine mystische Straßenreklame (1922)
 Dunkle Gassen (1923)
 Das verlorene Ich (1923)
 The Merchant of Venice (1923)
 The Lost Soul, or: The Dangers of Hypnotism (1923)
 Michael (1924)
 Peter the Pirate (1925)
 Excluded from the Public (1927)
 The Impostor (1927)
 Infantrist Wamperls dreijähriges Pech (1927)
 The Passion of Joan of Arc (1928)
 Franz Schubert und seine Zeit (1928)
 Die Bauernprinzessin (1928)
 Der Lohn der guten Tat (1928)
 Miss Europe (1930)
 Le monsieur de minuit (1931)
 Vampyr (1932)
 Monsieur Albert (1932)
 La couturière de Luneville (1932)
 Lily Christine (1932)
 Insult (1932)
 Aren't We All? (1932)
 The Merry Monarch (1933)
 Die Abenteuer des Königs Pausole (1933)
 Les aventures du roi Pausole (1933)
 Une femme au volant (1933)
 On the Streets (1933)
 Paprika (1933)
 The Last Billionaire (1934)
 Liliom (1934)
 Nothing More Than a Woman (1934) 
 Dante's Inferno (1935)
 Dressed to Thrill (1935)
 Metropolitan (1935)
 Navy Wife (1935)
 Professional Soldier (1935)
 Charlie Chan's Secret (1936)
 Dodsworth (1936)
 A Message to Garcia (1936)
 Our Relations (1936)
 Come and Get It (1936)
 Outcast (1937)
 Stella Dallas (1937)
 The Adventures of Marco Polo (1938)
 Blockade (1938)
 Youth Takes a Fling (1938)
 Trade Winds (1938)
 Love Affair (1939)
 The Real Glory (1939)
 My Favorite Wife (1940)
 Foreign Correspondent (1940)
 The Westerner (1940)
 Seven Sinners (1940)
 That Hamilton Woman (1941)
 The Flame of New Orleans (1941)
 It Started with Eve (1941)
 To Be or Not to Be (1942)
 The Pride of the Yankees (1942)
 They Got Me Covered (1943)
 Sahara (1943)
 Address Unknown (1944)
 Cover Girl (1944)
 Tonight and Every Night (1945)
 Over 21 (1945)
 Gilda (1946)
 Down to Earth (1947)
 It Had to Be You (1947)
 The Lady from Shanghai (1947)

References

External links

 
 
Rudolph Maté in the AFI Catalog
 Rudolph Maté in the Internet Encyclopedia of Cinematographers

1898 births
1964 deaths
Polish emigrants to the United States
Film people from Kraków
Polish cinematographers
Polish film directors
Polish people of Jewish descent